The Age of Sail is a period that lasted at the latest from the mid-16th (or mid-15th) to the mid-19th centuries, in which the dominance of sailing ships in global trade and warfare culminated, particularly marked by the introduction of naval artillery, and ultimately reached its highest extent at the advent of the analogue Age of Steam. Enabled by the advances of the related Age of Navigation, it is identified as a distinctive element of the early modern period and the Age of Discovery. Especially in context of the latter, it refers to a more particular Eurocentric Age of Sail, while generally the Age of Sail is the culminating period of a long intercontinental history of sailing.

Periodization

Like most periodic eras, the definition is inexact but instead serves as a general description. The term is used differently for warships and merchant vessels.

Sailing ships are an ancient technology, making far-reaching trade like the ancient spice trade possible. With the Mongol invasion of Java, cannons started to be used in naval warfare (e.g. Cetbang by the Majapahit), and by the 14th century naval artillery was employed in Europe, documented at the Battle of Arnemuiden (1338). The 15th century, besides the established seapowers of the central Indian Ocean trade, such as the maritime kingdoms of Austronesia, saw a rise in the deployment of oceans voyaging fleets (including carrying naval artillery) from the extreme points of the trade, such as the Ming treasure voyages or the Iberian naval ventures all the way along the African Atlantic coast and across the Atlantic Ocean, starting the Age of Discovery.

For warships, the age of sail runs roughly from the Battle of Lepanto in 1571, the last significant engagement in which oar-propelled galleys played a major role, to the development of steam-powered warships.

Golden Age of Sail
The period between the mid-19th century to the early 20th century, when sailing vessels reached their peak of size and complexity (e.g. Clippers and Windjammers), is sometimes referred to as the "Golden Age of Sail".

Decline
The first sea-going steamboat was Richard Wright's first steamboat Experiment, an ex-French lugger; she steamed from Leeds to Yarmouth in July 1813. The first iron steamship to go to sea was the 116-ton Aaron Manby, built in 1821 by Aaron Manby at the Horseley Ironworks, and became the first iron-built vessel to put to sea when she crossed the English Channel in 1822, arriving in Paris on 22 June. She carried passengers and freight to Paris in 1822 at an average speed of 8 knots (9 mph, 14 km/h). 

The first purpose-built steam battleship was the 90-gun  in 1850. Multiple steam battleships saw action during the Crimean war, especially the Allied (British, French and Ottoman) fleet Bombardment of Sevastopol as part of the Siege of Sevastopol (1854–1855). The first ironclad battleship, was launched by the French Navy in November 1859. In the March 1862 Battle of Hampton Roads, the ironclad  fought , making this the first fight between ironclads.

By 1873, the Age of Sail for warships had ended, with  commissioned in 1871. Devastation was the first class of ocean-going battleships that did not carry sails.

Sailing ships continued to be an economical way to transport bulk cargo on long voyages into the 1920s and 1930s, though steamships soon pushed them out of those trades as well. Sailing ships do not require fuel or complex engines to be powered; thus they tended to be more independent from sophisticated dedicated support bases on land. Crucially though, steam-powered ships held a speed advantage and were rarely hindered by adverse winds, freeing steam-powered vessels from the necessity of following trade winds. As a result, cargo and supplies could reach a foreign port in a fraction of the time it took a sailing ship.

Sailing vessels were pushed into narrower and narrower economic niches and gradually disappeared from commercial trade. Today, sailing vessels are only economically viable for small-scale coastal fishing, along with recreational uses such as yachting and passenger sail excursion ships.

In recent decades, the commercial shipping industry has been reviving interest in wind assisted ships as a way to conserve fuel in the interest of sustainability.

Legacy 
A New Age of Sail has been predicted by some experts to occur by 2030, driven by a revolution in energy technology and a desire to reduce carbon emissions from maritime shipping through wind-assisted propulsion. The book Trade Winds: A Voyage to a Sustainable Future for Shipping, discusses the potential of a return to wind propulsion through the firsthand experiences Christiaan De Beukelaer, who spent five months aboard a sailing cargo ship in 2020.

See also

 Age of Discovery
 Columbian Exchange
 Indian Ocean trade
 Maritime Silk Road
 Maritime timeline
 Naval history
 Sailing ship tactics
 Sea lane

Notes

References

 
1571 establishments
1862 disestablishments
Early Modern period
Exploration
Historical eras
History of geography
Maritime culture
Maritime history
Navigation
Sailing